Prony or de Prony may refer to:

 Gaspard de Prony (1755–1839), French mathematician and engineer
 Prony's method, a mathematical method to estimate the components of a signal
 Prony equation, hydraulics equation for fictional head loss
 Prony series, a model of viscoelasticity
 Prony brake, torque measurement device
 Prony Bay, bay in New Caledonia
 Prony, a city in New Caledonia, see List of cities in New Caledonia
 French corvette Prony

See also
 Pronya, a river in Ryazan and Tula Oblasts in Russia